Loveridge's sunbird (Cinnyris loveridgei) is a species of bird in the family Nectariniidae.
It is endemic to Tanzania.

Its natural habitat is subtropical or tropical moist montane forests.
It is threatened by habitat loss.

The common name and Latin binomial commemorate the American herpetologist Arthur Loveridge .

References

External links
BirdLife Species Factsheet.

Loveridge's sunbird
Endemic birds of Tanzania
Loveridge's sunbird
Taxonomy articles created by Polbot